The Albania national under-18 football team represents Albania in international football at this age level and is controlled by Albanian Football Association, the governing body for football in Albania.

The Albania U18 football team is a feeder team of Albania U19.

The team competed in the UEFA European Under-18 Football Championship, but after the rule change in 2000s, the event had an age limit of 19.

History

1982 UEFA European Under-18 Championship

First round

|}

Second round - Group D

Squad
COACH:  Bahri Ishka

The following players participated in the tournament.

1983 UEFA European Under-18 Championship

First round 

|}

Squad
COACH:  Resul Ahmeti

The following players participated in the tournament.

Triple friendly match against Turkey in 1983
Between 10 and 14 August 1983 Albania U18 played 3 friendly matches against Turkey U18 winning the first one 3–0, losing 3–1 the second game and taking a goalless draw in the last match. Sokol Kushta scored 3 goals between these matches.

1988 UEFA European Under-18 Championship

Group 7

Squad
COACH: 

The following players participated in the tournament.

1990 UEFA European Under-18 Championship

Group 4

Squad
COACH: 

The following players participated in the tournament.

1993 UEFA European Under-18 Championship

|}

Squad
COACH: 

The following players participated in the tournament.

1997 UEFA European Under-18 Championship qualifying

Group 10
All matches were played in Spain.

Squad
COACH:  Bujar Kasmi

The following players participated in the tournament.

1998 UEFA European Under-18 Championship qualifying

Group 2
All matches were played in the Czech Republic.

Squad
COACH:  Bujar Kasmi

The following players participated in the tournament.

1999 UEFA European Under-18 Championship qualifying

Group 6
All matches were played in Italy.

Squad
COACH:  Bujar Kasmi

The following players participated in the tournament.

2000 UEFA European Under-18 Championship qualifying

Group 6
All matches were played in Finland.

Squad
COACH:  Petrit Haxhia

The following players participated in the tournament.

2001 UEFA European Under-18 Championship qualifying

Group 4
All matches were played in Turkey.

Squad
COACH:  Petrit Haxhia

The following players participated in the tournament.

Current squad
The following players were named in the last squad for the friendly match against Italy on 19 May 2011 (When they last played a match).

Players in italics have played internationally at a higher level.

Competitive record

UEFA Youth Tournament Under-18 Record

UEFA European Under-18 Championship Record

*Denotes draws include knockout matches decided on penalty kicks.

See also 
 Albania national football team
 Albania national under-23 football team
 Albania national under-21 football team
 Albania national under-20 football team
 Albania national under-19 football team
 Albania national under-17 football team
 Albania national under-16 football team
 Albania national under-15 football team
 Albania national football team results
 Albania national youth football team
 Albanian Superliga
 Football in Albania
 List of Albania international footballers

References

External links 
 UEFA European U-19 C'ship - UEFA.com
 Albania National Football Team
 FutbolliShqiptar.net
 Fan Website
 AlbaniaSoccer.com
 AIFR archive of results: 1946–2000/01
 Tifozat Kuq e Zi / Red and Black Fan Club
 Rec.Sport.Soccer Statistics Foundation – Albania
 Albania Sport
 Albanian Soccer News
 
 
 

under-18
European national under-18 association football teams
Football in Albania